The 5th Central Auditing Committee (CAC) of the Workers' Party of Korea (WPK), officially the Central Auditing Committee of the 5th Congress of the Workers' Party of Korea, was elected by the 5th Congress on 12 November 1970.

Members

References

Citations

Bibliography
Books:
 
 
  

Dissertations:
 

5th Central Auditing Committee of the Workers' Party of Korea
1970 establishments in North Korea
1980 disestablishments in North Korea